Zouhair Laaroubi (born 20 July 1984) is a Moroccan professional footballer, who plays as a goalkeeper for Ittihad Tanger in Botola.

Career
Laaroubi started his career playing for KAC Kénitra. Later on, he played for Difaâ Hassani El Jadidi and Wydad AC, before joining Saudi Ohod Club in 2018. He later returned to Morocco to join Moghreb Tétouan and RS Berkane. In August 2021, he joined Maghreb de Fès.

Honours
Difaâ Hassani El Jadidi
Moroccan Throne Cup: 2013

Wydad AC
Botola: 2016–17
CAF Champions League: 2017
CAF Super Cup: 2018

RS Berkane
CAF Confederation Cup: 2020

References

1984 births
Living people
People from Kenitra
Moroccan footballers
Association football goalkeepers
Botola players
Saudi Professional League players
KAC Kénitra players
Difaâ Hassani El Jadidi players
Wydad AC players
Ohod Club players
Moghreb Tétouan players
RS Berkane players
Maghreb de Fès players
Moroccan expatriate footballers
Moroccan expatriate sportspeople in Saudi Arabia
Expatriate footballers in Saudi Arabia
2020 African Nations Championship players
Morocco A' international footballers